Bush v. Palm Beach County Canvassing Board, 531 U.S. 70 (2000), was a United States Supreme Court decision involving Florida voters during the 2000 presidential election.  In this case, the U.S. Supreme Court requested clarification from the Florida Supreme Court regarding the decision it had made in Palm Beach County Canvassing Board v. Harris (Harris I).  Shortly after the Florida Supreme Court provided those clarifications on December 11, the U.S. Supreme Court resolved the election in favor of George W. Bush over Al Gore in the case of Bush v. Gore.

Background
The 2000 presidential election was contingent upon who won the popular vote in Florida. Republican George W. Bush was narrowly ahead in the tally.  Democrat Al Gore challenged the decision of Katherine Harris, Florida's Secretary of State, to certify Bush as the winner on November 14 (a 7-day deadline set by Florida statute § 102.111). Gore asserted that Harris had disregarded manual recount results in four Florida counties. The Florida Supreme Court, in deciding between two conflicting provisions of Florida statute (§ 102.111 and § 102.112), enjoined Harris from certifying the election results and invoked its equitable powers to set a November 26 deadline for a return of ballot counts, thereby extending the deadline by 12 days. (The court allowed Harris the option of setting the deadline as November 27, which was a Monday. Harris did not.)  The court directed Harris to accept manual recounts submitted prior to the new deadline. Bush then appealed the Florida Supreme Court decision to the U.S. Supreme Court.

Issues before U.S. Supreme Court

The Court was faced with two questions.  First, did post-election court decisions in Florida violate the Due Process Clause of the U.S. Constitution or ? Second, did the Florida Supreme Court violate Article II of the United States Constitution, which confers plenary power in the appointment of Electors on state legislatures, when the Florida Supreme Court allegedly changed the manner in which Florida's electoral votes were chosen?

Holding
The Court unanimously held that there was "considerable uncertainty" as to the reasons for the Florida Supreme Court's decision. According to Vanity Fair, "The unanimity was, in fact, a charade; four of the justices had no beef at all with the Florida Supreme Court, while at least four others were determined to overturn it." Therefore, the Court declined to review the questions presented, instead vacating the Florida Supreme Court decision and remanding the case for clarification of two questions.  First, to what extent did the Florida Supreme Court see the Florida Constitution as circumscribing the legislature's authority under Article II of the federal Constitution (i.e., 
whether it had based its ruling on the state constitution, which the Bush team had said was improper, or had acted under state statute, which was arguably permissible.)? Second, how much consideration did the Florida Supreme Court give to a relevant federal statute, namely 3 U.S.C. § 5?

See also
 Bush v. Gore (2000)
 Moore v. Harper (2023)

References

External links
 

2000 United States presidential election in Florida
United States Supreme Court cases
United States Supreme Court cases of the Rehnquist Court
United States elections case law
2000 in United States case law